Velocity was a free, weekly newspaper published between December 3, 2003, and June 15, 2011, by The Courier-Journal of Louisville, Kentucky.

The full-color tabloid was distributed at 1,800 locations in a 13-county area in Kentucky and Southern Indiana.

Velocity was widely seen as an attempt by the Courier-Journal and its parent company, Gannett, to gain some of the market dominated by the Louisville Eccentric Observer, an alternative newsweekly.

Velocity targeted the 25-to-34-year-old age demographic. It was consciously non-political, although it occasionally covered hot-button issues such as the Iraq War, local and national elections, the ban on public smoking in Louisville, and gay life.

Regular weekly features included "The Bar Hopper", in which a local tavern was profiled; "The Party Crasher", a photo-story from the weekend's parties; and "What I'm Into", a mini-profile of a local person.

Velocity was discontinued during a round of budget cuts by Gannett.

References

External links
Courier-Journal website

Defunct newspapers published in Louisville, Kentucky
Publications established in 2003
Publications disestablished in 2011
2003 establishments in Kentucky
2011 disestablishments in Kentucky
Courier Journal